Keith Harris (born 10 October 1952) is an Australian former professional rugby league footballer who played in the 1970s and 1980s.

A former Tamworth junior, Keith Harris represented New South Wales rugby league team twice in 1975 during his two years at the Canterbury Bulldogs (1975-1976). He then returned to North Sydney Bears for another seven seasons. Following that he retired from the Sydney competition and played for the Aberdeen Tigers for two years and won one premiership. The Werris Creek Magpies and won one premiership. The Asquith Magpies to be beaten in the Grand Final, the Southport Tigers with one premiership and coached the Tweed Head Seagulls. He was also the manager of the Burleigh Bears Colts.

Keith Harris played a total of 9 seasons at North Sydney Bears between 1973-1974 and 1977–1983. During this period, he captained the Bears on numerous occasions. He retired at the end of the 1983 season.

He scored 29 tries, kicked 9 goals and 1 field goal for a total of 106 points during his 11-year NSWRFL career.

References

Australian rugby league administrators
Australian rugby league coaches
Australian rugby league players
North Sydney Bears players
Canterbury-Bankstown Bulldogs players
1952 births
Living people
Rugby league players from New South Wales